

Released songs
This list is an attempt to document every song recorded and released under the name of Beach Boys band member Dennis Wilson, whether on an album, single, compilation or anthology album (not necessarily songs written by him).

 
Wilson, Dennis
The Beach Boys